Rychkovo is a rural locality (a village) in Golovinskoye Rural Settlement, Sudogodsky District, Vladimir Oblast, Russia. The population was 14 as of 2010.

Geography 
Rychkovo is located 31 km west of Sudogda (the district's administrative centre) by road. Alferovo is the nearest rural locality.

References 

Rural localities in Sudogodsky District